St. Xavier’s School, Raiganj, is a private Catholic primary and secondary school located in Raiganj, West Bengal, India. The co-educational school opened by the Jesuits in 1999.

In 2015 the school average for the ISC was 76.

See also

 List of Jesuit schools
 List of schools in West Bengal

References

Jesuit secondary schools in India
Educational institutions established in 1999
Jesuit primary schools in India
Christian schools in West Bengal
Primary schools in West Bengal
High schools and secondary schools in West Bengal
1999 establishments in West Bengal